Town Hall tram stop is a tram stop on Line 1 of the West Midlands Metro located in Birmingham outside the Birmingham Town Hall. It opened on 11 December 2019 when the line was extended from Grand Central to Birmingham Library.In July 2022 the line was further extended to Edgbaston Village.

References

External links

Railway stations in Great Britain opened in 2019
West Midlands Metro stops